Mukuru Kwa Njenga is a slum in the Mukuru slums of Nairobi. Mukuru kwa Njenga is among other villages in Mukuru namely; Mukuru kwa Reuben, Mukuru kwa Njenga, Sinai, Paradise, Jamaica, Kingstone, Mariguini, Fuata Nyayo and Kayaba. The population exceeds 100,000.

Living conditions
Mukuru slums as any other slum in the world has been faced by different challenges including crime, drug abuse, prostitution and other challenges that face slums all over the world, but the people of Mukuru have been able to continuously fight this challenges and this has enabled many improvements in the community. In the slums, whole families live, or at least survive, in tiny one-roomed corrugated iron shacks, measuring approximately 3 m x 3 m. Very few homes have access to electricity and up to twenty families might share a communal water tap and toilet latrine.

Details 
There are two government schools in Mukuru Kwa Njenga, Kwa Njenga Primary School  and Our Lady of Nazareth primary school which is partly sponsored by the, Society of Mary (Latin: Societas Mariae) is a clerical religious congregation of Pontifical Right for men (brothers and priests) commonly called the Marianist. The Medical Missionary of Mary and the newly commissioned, Our Lady Of Nazareth Health Center serves the health needs of the community.
The Holy Ghost fathers have a big project and a Catholic church. There have been cholera deaths in 2009. Mukuru kwa Njenga has Anglican churches. Residents of the slum were in fear of a mass eviction of more than 50,000 persons in 2002.

Settlement profiling
The settlement profiling process include identifying the stakeholders, organizing of stakeholder forums for good representation, community mobilisation and awareness creation, training of data collectors, and focus group discussions and interviews. The field research was conducted in six designated survey areas: Riara (SEPU), Mukuru Kwa Ruben, Mukuru Kwa Njenga, Viwandani, Kiandumu (Thika, Kiambu County), and selected wards in Nairobi County that do not predominantly feature slums. [This paragraph needs further clarification, but it appears to be drawn from projects of the College of Environmental Design, University of California-Berkeley, described in a series of blog posts.]

The Mukuru settlements have been designated as a Special Planning Area (SPA) due to their unique planning challenges and opportunities.

Notable residents
Kenyan international footballer Patrick Oboya was born in Mukuru Kwa Njenga. Other notable figures include Geoffrey Mboya, a young humanitarian advocate and climate activist who passionately advocates for Sustainable Development Goals in the settlements. He has presented the urban climate resilience in the context of urban poverty at the London Climate Action Week and UN Climate Conference. DJ Peter Adams one of the most famous DJ who had a very big career on KTN and Radio Maisha was born and raised in Mukuru kwa Reuben. Shabu Mwangi and Adam Masava are two of Kenya's fine artists who have exhibited internationally. Adam Masava who is also a teacher who has taught local children art and they have participated and won in various fine arts competition including the Toyota arts project. U-Tena arts group has been making a change in Mukuru and have performed in multiple international events and in Kenya. Micato Safaris has been offering scholarships to needy children, supporting education to Mukuru residents through a free library and a free Computer Centre and a Water project. There are also organizations like SHOFCO which also try to improve the livelihoods of Mukuru residents.

See also
Kibera
Kawangware
Kiambiu
Korogocho
Mathare
Mathare Valley

References

External links
2019 Population census on Mukuru

Suburbs of Nairobi
Shanty towns in Kenya
Slums in Kenya